Ivy Supersonic (born Ivy Silberstein; June 14, 1967) is a New York City fashion designer, self-promoter, event planner, and animated character designer. She is the daughter of Jerome Silberstein, founder of Silberstein, Awad & Miklos. She also paints under her birth name.

Fashion and promotion
Supersonic is a graduate of the Fashion Institute of Technology. She launched the denim brand I.B.I.V. during her university student years. Within three months of their launch, the jeans were featured on the cover of Women's Wear Daily, have also been featured on MTV, Beverly Hills, 90210 and Good Morning America. She has designed hats for Pamela Anderson, Carmen Electra, Snoop Dogg, and George Clinton, among others.

Visual arts

Supersonic pursued legal action against 20th Century Fox after Scrat, a character in the Ice Age franchise, appeared to bear a resemblance to Sqrat, a squirrel-rat hybrid she presented to Blue Sky Studios in 1999. In 2003, a judge found Supersonic and Blue Sky had equal claim to Scrat. Disney, which inherited Blue Sky and the franchise in its purchase of 21st Century Fox entertainment assets, reached a settlement in 2019.

In 2017, as Ivy Silberstein, she had a show of her artwork, particularly her watercolors, in Manhattan.

References

External links

Ivy's Official Homepage

1967 births
Living people
American fashion designers
Fashion Institute of Technology alumni
Event planners
20th-century American painters
21st-century American painters